Dancing Queen is the twenty-sixth studio album by American singer Cher, released by Warner Bros. Records on September 28, 2018. It is Cher's first album in five years, following Closer to the Truth (2013). The album contains cover versions of songs recorded by Swedish pop group ABBA, with the title referencing their 1976 song "Dancing Queen". The album follows Cher's appearance in the 2018 musical film Mamma Mia! Here We Go Again, based on the music of ABBA.

The album was a critical and commercial success, debuting at number three on the US Billboard 200 with first-week sales of 153,000 album-equivalent units, becoming Cher's highest debut sales week for an album in the United States. The album also peaked within the top ten of charts in another 18 countries, with nine of those being top five entries. As of March 2019, Dancing Queen has been certified gold by Music Canada and silver by BPI.

To promote the album, Cher embarked on the Here We Go Again Tour, which began on September 21, 2018. It also marks her first worldwide tour since Living Proof: The Farewell Tour.

Background
After previously appearing in Mamma Mia! Here We Go Again, for which she recorded "Fernando" and "Super Trouper", Cher was inspired to do an ABBA cover album.

While recording, Cher hinted on her Twitter account that she might be releasing an ABBA cover album. On July 16, 2018, it was officially revealed in an interview with The Today Show that the album would consist of ABBA covers. She further stated:
"After filming Mamma Mia! Here We Go Again, I was reminded again of what great and timeless songs they wrote and started thinking, 'Why not do an album of their music?' The songs were harder to sing than I imagined but I'm so happy with how the music came out. I'm really excited for people to hear it. It's a perfect time." —Cher

Cher also said that "[she has] always liked ABBA and saw the original Mamma Mia! musical on Broadway three times".

In addition to that, Cher was asked about what people can expect from the album. She replied with saying, "It's not what you think of when you think 'ABBA', because [she] did it in a different way."

On August 9, 2018, it was announced that the album would be released on September 28, 2018.

Singles and promotion

Singles
On August 8, 2018, Cher released a teaser of the album's first single "Gimme! Gimme! Gimme! (A Man After Midnight)" on her Twitter account. The song was released the following day. People who pre-ordered the album on iTunes immediately received a digital copy of the single. The song peaked at number four on the Hot Dance Club Songs chart. An extended version of "Gimme! Gimme! Gimme! (A Man After Midnight)" was released on September 14, 2018.

The second single, "SOS" was released on August 23, 2018. It peaked at number 56 on the Scottish singles chart. A music video for the song was released on September 18, 2018.

Live performances
Cher performed "SOS" at the Ellen Show in 2018. On September 18, 2019 Cher performed "Waterloo" at the season 14 finale of America's Got Talent, to promote the album and her Here We Go Again Tour.

Tour

A world tour, titled the Here We Go Again Tour, in support of Dancing Queen, began on September 21, 2018, in Auckland, New Zealand. It was officially announced on May 7, 2018. "Fernando", "Waterloo", and "SOS" were the only songs off the album Cher performed, however.

Critical reception

According to Metacritic, which calculated a weighted average score of 79 out of 100 from 10 music critics, the album received "generally favorable reviews". Gay Star News gave the album a positive review, saying: "If she'd approached this collection of ABBA re-recordings with the seriousness of, say, George Michael on the excellent Songs from the Last Century, she'd have been in big trouble. Instead, Dancing Queen is about fun, entertainment, dizzy abandonment. She knows how to please a crowd, while also acknowledging the desires of her die-hard fans." Marc Snetiker from Entertainment Weekly gave the album a favorable review, calling it Cher's "most significant release since 1998’s Believe" and saying that "the album ender, 'One of Us,' is frankly one of Cher’s best recordings in years."

Nick Levine from Gay Times praised Cher's vocals, calling them "glorious [...] – still rich and wonderfully androgynous-sounding" and pointing out that they "drive each song from beginning to end." Rolling Stones Brittany Spanos commented that "the 72-year-old makes ABBA songs not only sound like they should’ve been written for her in the first place but like they firmly belong in 2018". At Idolator, Mike Wass felt that "every track exudes the glitter, fun and nostalgia of a bygone era" and that "Dancing Queen, while disappointingly brief, covers all bases from dreamy disco moments and emotional ballads."

In a positive review for The Guardian, it was noted that "occasionally Cher uses her trademark Auto-Tune like a crutch [...] but mostly it acts as a kind of interstellar portal that elevates Abba from the dancefloor to the cosmos." In a review for The Times, Will Hodgkinson was less positive; he stated that the album delivered "exactly the results you would expect" and that "There's nothing to dislike, but also nothing to recommend beyond this being a fun, tacky choice for the Christmas party."

Rolling Stone placed Dancing Queen on fifth place of all pop albums released in 2018, as well as placing Cher's version of "The Name of the Game" as the 22nd best song of the year. The album's music video of "SOS" was ranked as the 18th best music video of 2018 by Paper.

Accolades

 for "The Name of the Game"
 for "SOS"

Commercial performance
In the US, the album debuted at number three on the Billboard 200 with first-week sales of 153,000 album-equivalent units, becoming Cher's highest debut sales for an album in the United States. It also ties the record for Cher's highest-charting solo album on that chart, which she first reached when her album Closer to the Truth also debuted and peaked at number three. It went on to spend 8 weeks in the chart.

The album also debuted at number two in Canada, Cher's highest peak for a studio album there since 1998's Believe. Dancing Queen went on to be certified gold by Music Canada for sales of over 40,000 copies.

In the UK the album debuted at number two as well, giving Cher her highest-charting studio album there since 1992's Greatest Hits: 1965–1992, with 22,677 units. The album was certified silver by the British Phonographic Industry (BPI) for selling over 60,000 copies and landed at number 91 on the year end chart for 2018.
In Ireland, the album gave Cher her first top ten album in 20 years when it debuted at number ten.

In Australia the album debuted at number two, making it Cher's highest-charting studio album there since Heart of Stone topped the chart in 1989.

The album also reached the top five in Hungary, peaking at number five, as well as placing 61st in the country's year-end chart.

Track listing
All tracks are written by Benny Andersson, Björn Ulvaeus, and Stig Anderson and produced by Mark Taylor (tracks 1-7 and 9-10) and Benny Andersson (track 8), except where noted.

Notes
 signifies a vocal producer

Personnel
Credits for Dancing Queen adapted from AllMusic.

Benny Andersson – executive producer, keyboards, mixing, piano, producer (all on "Fernando")
Göran Arnberg – orchestration, transcription
Chris Barrett – assistant engineer
Rob Barron – piano
Mat Bartram – engineer
Thomas Bowes – orchestra leader
Matt Brind – string arrangements, string conductor
Andy Caine – background vocals
Cher – vocals, concept, executive producer 
Judy Craymer – executive producer
Björn Engelmann – mastering
Mats Englund – bass on "Fernando"
Linn Fijal – assistant engineer
Matt Furmidge – mixing
Isobel Griffiths – orchestra contractor
Jeri Heiden – art direction, design
Lasse Jonsson – guitar
Martin Koch – conductor, orchestration
Per Lindvall – drums on "Fernando"
Bernard Löhr – engineer, mixing
London Session Orchestra – orchestration
Stephen Marcussen – mastering
Paul Meehan – engineer, keyboards, programming
Simon Meredith – saxophone
Machado Cicala Morassut – photography
Rocco Palladino – bass
Adam Phillips – guitar
Hayley Sanderson – background vocals
Ash Soan – drums
Nick Steinhardt – art direction, design
Jörgen Stenberg – percussion
Mark Taylor – engineer, keyboards, producer, programming, vocal producer
Björn Ulvaeus – executive producer on "Fernando"
Lasse Wellander – guitar on "Fernando"

Charts

Weekly charts

Year-end charts

Certifications and sales

References

2018 albums
ABBA tribute albums
Cher albums
Covers albums
Warner Records albums
Albums produced by Mark Taylor (music producer)
Albums produced by Benny Andersson
Albums produced by Björn Ulvaeus